Eilean I Vow is a small island in Loch Lomond in west central Scotland. Other variants of the name include Ellan I Vow, Eilean a' Vow, Elanvow, Ellan Vhow and Island I Vow.  The island is listed in 13th/14th century charters as "Elanvow".

It is opposite Rubha Bàn, a point on the mainland, and north of Inveruglas Isle. It is 10 m at its highest point, and 0.08 km long.

The island was a stronghold of Clan MacFarlane, and there are the remains of their castle on it, which was built to replace the one on Inveruglas Isle. In 1710, Buchanan of Auchmar described it as "a pretty good house with gardens".

The etymology of the name may alternatively represent "Eilean a' Bhuth" (island of the shop or store) or "Eilean a' Bhogha" (Island of the Sunken Rock).  For more research on the historical names of Island I Vow click here.  In 1962, I.M.M. McPhail speculated that the name might derive from Eilean a' Bhò or "Island of the Cow", but Scottish Gaelic experts, including experts at Ainmean-Àite na h-Alba, have indicated that that is not grammatically correct and is not possible.

Island I Vow archaeology and preservation
Island I Vow is protected as a scheduled monument by the Scottish Government under the Ancient Monuments and Archaeological Areas Act 1979. The castle is of national importance for its historical associations with the MacFarlane chiefs and for the potential of its above and below ground archaeology as a representative example of medieval island strongholds. The castle was still inhabited in 1724 but was in ruins by 1814. The east and south walls of the castle are in a reasonable state of preservation, but the north wall is mostly collapsed above ground and first floor level. An assessment of the condition of the site in 2012 during  low loch levels revealed the presence of a perimeter wall around the entire island.

The Ellan Vhow Preservation Fund (The Elanvow Preservation Fund) has been set up to support archaeological study and preservation of this historic site.

References
 Worsley, Harry Loch Lomond: The Loch, the Lairds and the Legends  Lindsay Publications (Glasgow) 1988

External links

 http://islandivow.org/
 Ellan Vhow Preservation Fund
 The Elanvow Preservation Fund
 https://web.archive.org/web/20120218135111/http://www.incallander.me.uk/loch-lomond.htm
 https://web.archive.org/web/20090710015304/http://lochlomond-islands.com/
 article which mentions it

Islands of Loch Lomond
Uninhabited islands of Argyll and Bute